Lydia V. Crafts is an American politician and social worker serving as a member of the Maine House of Representatives from the 90th district. She assumed office on December 2, 2020.

Early life and education 
Crafts was born in Belfast, Maine. She earned a Bachelor of Arts degree in anthropology from Smith College and a Master of Social Work from the University of Maine.

Career 
Outside of politics, Crafts works as a clinical social worker and the behavior program director of Bristol Consolidated School. She was elected to the Maine House of Representatives in November 2020 and assumed office on December 2, 2020.

References 

Year of birth missing (living people)
Living people
Democratic Party members of the Maine House of Representatives
Women state legislators in Maine
People from Belfast, Maine
Smith College alumni
University of Maine alumni
American social workers